Carlo "Carletto" Mattioli (born 23 October 1954 in Pergola, Pesaro e Urbino) is a retired male race walker from Italy, who represented his native country twice at the Olympic Games: 1984 and 1988.

Biography
Carlo Mattioli has won eight times the individual national championship, He won five medal at the IAAF World Race Walking Team Championships with the Italy national athletics team and four at the individual level in others international athletics competitions.

Achievements

National titles
Italian Athletics Championships
10,000 metres walk track: 1980, 1986 (2)
20 km walk: road: 1987 (1)
Italian Indoor Athletics Championships
5000 metres walk: 1979, 1980, 1985, 1986, 1987 (5)

References

External links
 

1954 births
Living people
People from Pergola, Marche
Italian male racewalkers
Athletes (track and field) at the 1984 Summer Olympics
Athletes (track and field) at the 1988 Summer Olympics
Olympic athletes of Italy
Universiade medalists in athletics (track and field)
World Athletics Championships athletes for Italy
Mediterranean Games silver medalists for Italy
Mediterranean Games bronze medalists for Italy
Athletes (track and field) at the 1979 Mediterranean Games
Athletes (track and field) at the 1987 Mediterranean Games
Mediterranean Games medalists in athletics
Universiade silver medalists for Italy
Medalists at the 1981 Summer Universiade
Athletics competitors of Centro Sportivo Carabinieri
Sportspeople from the Province of Pesaro and Urbino
20th-century Italian people